Paul Edinger (born January 17, 1978) is an American former gridiron football placekicker. He was drafted by the Chicago Bears in the sixth round of the 2000 NFL Draft. He played college football at Michigan State.

Edinger has also played for the Chicago Bears, Minnesota Vikings, Chicago Rush, and Jacksonville Sharks.

Professional career

Chicago Bears
Edinger was drafted by the Chicago Bears in the sixth round (174th overall) in the 2000 NFL Draft. He played five seasons with the team and set a personal best with an 83.9 field goal percentage in 2001. He kicked 62.5% in his last year with Chicago and was released. In five seasons with the Bears, Paul Edinger made 110 out of 146 (76.9%) field goals and made all of his 133 extra point attempts.

Minnesota Vikings
Edinger signed with the Minnesota Vikings as a free agent in 2005. His 56-yard game-winning field goal against the Green Bay Packers on October 23, 2005 is the longest ever in Vikings history, tied with Blair Walsh's 56-yard attempt against the Houston Texans in Week 16 of the 2012 season. The kick was also his personal long. He was not re-signed following the season. In his only season as a Minnesota Viking, Edinger made 25 of 34 (73.5%) field goals and all of his 31 extra point attempts.

Edinger is in a two-way tie for most accurate extra point kicker in NFL history, a perfect 100%.

Chicago Rush
After being out of football since 2005, Edinger signed a three-year contract with the Chicago Rush of the Arena Football League. However, he was released a week later. He was re-signed on June 3, 2008 after the release of Rush kicker Dan Frantz. His next game, he pulled his groin before the game and spent the rest of the season on IR. He played one game for the Rush

Jacksonville Sharks
Edinger signed with the Jacksonville Sharks on January 2, 2010.

Pittsburgh Power
Edinger signed with the Pittsburgh Power on November 1, 2010.

Kicking style
Edinger is known for his unusual  "corkscrew" kicking motion:  before the snap he faces backwards in the direction of the opposite side of the field.  As the ball is snapped he turns as he steps in a circular pattern toward the ball.

References

External links
Jacksonville Sharks bio

1978 births
Living people
Sportspeople from Lakeland, Florida
Players of American football from Florida
Players of American football from Michigan
American football placekickers
Michigan State Spartans football players
Chicago Bears players
Minnesota Vikings players
Chicago Rush players
Jacksonville Sharks players
Pittsburgh Power players